The Black River, known as the Lamington River downstream of Pottersville, is a tributary of the North Branch Raritan River in central New Jersey in the United States.

The Black River starts near that of the North Branch Raritan River, several miles west of Morristown, rising out of Sunset Lake in Mine Hill New Jersey. and flows through the Black River Wildlife Management Area, the Black River County Park, and Hacklebarney State Park.  It flows through Chester, New Jersey and the town middle school is named after it.

See also
List of rivers of New Jersey

References

External links
Black River Wildlife Management Area (PDF)
Hacklebarney State Park
U.S. Geological Survey: NJ stream gaging stations
History of the Black River & Western Railroad - A railroad that is named after the Black River.

Tributaries of the Raritan River
Rivers of New Jersey
Rivers of Morris County, New Jersey